Quenton Emerson Nelson (born March 19, 1996) is an American football guard for the Indianapolis Colts of the National Football League (NFL). He played college football at Notre Dame, where he was a unanimous All-American, and was selected by the Colts sixth overall in the 2018 NFL Draft. Considered among the NFL's best guards, Nelson received Pro Bowl and All-Pro selections in his first four seasons, including first-team All-Pros in his first three.

Early years
Nelson is the youngest of four children of Craig and Maryellen Nelson. He grew up in Holmdel Township, New Jersey and attended Holmdel High School as a freshman before transferring to Red Bank Catholic High School in Red Bank, New Jersey, where he was an All-Star in basketball as a power forward/center. He committed to the University of Notre Dame to play college football. Nelson also supplemented his football and strength trainings with Taekwondo.

College career
After redshirting his first year at Notre Dame in 2014, Nelson played in all 12 games and made one start in 2015. In 2016, he started all 12 games. He was named a unanimous first team All-American after the 2017 season.  On January 8, 2018, Nelson announced that he would forgo his last year of eligibility and enter the draft.

Professional career

NFL Draft
At the conclusion of the pre-draft process, Nelson was projected a top ten selection in the first round by NFL draft experts and scouts. He was ranked as the top offensive linemen prospect in the draft by Sports Illustrated and NFL analysts Daniel Jeremiah and Mike Mayock.

2018 season
The Indianapolis Colts selected Nelson in the first round (sixth overall) of the 2018 NFL Draft. On May 11, 2018, the Colts signed Nelson to a fully guaranteed four-year, $23.88 million contract, including a signing bonus of $15.45 million. On November 1, 2018, Nelson was named the NFL Offensive Rookie of the Month for October, after he was part of an offensive line that hadn't allowed a sack in 156 straight dropbacks and had 200 rushing yards in back-to-back games for first time  in 33 years. Nelson becoming the first guard to ever win the award, and he and Shaquille Leonard (who won Defensive Player of the Month in September) became the first teammates to win awards in the same season. He was named to the Pro Bowl as a rookie and was named first-team All-Pro.

2019 season
In the 2019 season, Nelson appeared in and started all 16 games for the Colts. He played 1,042 snaps, allowing zero sacks and committing just three penalties; he earned a grade of 91.2 from Pro Football Focus. For the second consecutive season, he was named as a First Team All-Pro and earned a Pro Bowl nomination.

2020 season
In the 2020 season, Nelson again appeared in and started all 16 games for the Colts for the third year in a row. He played 1,082 snaps, only allowed one sack, and committed nine penalties. For the third straight year, Nelson was named as a first-team All-Pro and earned his third Pro Bowl nomination.

2021 season
On April 28, 2021, the Colts exercised the fifth-year option on Nelson's contract, which guarantees a salary of $13.754 million for the 2022 season. On August 3, it was revealed that Nelson needed surgery on his left foot, a similar injury that Carson Wentz had suffered a week prior. Recovery time was projected to be 5-12 weeks, but the doctors deemed that the injury was not as serious. In Week 3, he suffered a high ankle sprain and was placed on injured reserve on October 2, 2021. He was activated on October 23.

Nelson was named Associated Press Second Team All-Pro. He has the most total All-Pro selections (four) and the most First Team All-Pro selections (three from 2018-20) by a guard in franchise history.

Nelson became just the second player in team history to earn Pro Bowl honors in his first four seasons, joining Alan Ameche (1955-58). He also became the first offensive lineman in the NFL to do it in his first four seasons since Zack Martin (2014-17) and is the first Indianapolis player to be selected to four consecutive Pro Bowls since T.Y. Hilton (2014-17). The last Colts offensive linemen to be selected to four consecutive Pro Bowls were Chris Hinton (six consecutive, 1983-89) and Ray Donaldson (four consecutive, 1986-89).

2022 season
On September 10, 2022, Nelson signed a four-year, $80 million contract extension with $60 million guaranteed through 2026, making him the highest-paid guard in the league.

NFL career statistics

References

External links

Notre Dame Fighting Irish bio
Indianapolis Colts bio

1996 births
Living people
Holmdel High School alumni
People from Holmdel Township, New Jersey
Sportspeople from Monmouth County, New Jersey
Players of American football from New Jersey
American football offensive guards
Red Bank Catholic High School alumni
Notre Dame Fighting Irish football players
All-American college football players
Indianapolis Colts players
American Conference Pro Bowl players